Owen William Teague (born December 8, 1998) is an American actor. He was born and raised in Tampa, Florida, and is known for his roles in The Stand, Mrs. Fletcher, Inherit the Viper, To Leslie, Montana Story, Gone in the Night, Bloodline, and the episode "Arkangel" of the fourth season of Black Mirror (2017). Teague also appeared as Patrick Hockstetter in It and It Chapter Two, and had key roles in the drama Every Day and the thriller I See You.

In 2020, he was cast as Harold Lauder in the CBS miniseries The Stand.

Early life and education
Teague was born and raised in Tampa, Florida. Both his parents were musicians and he played violin until 15. Teague was interested in acting beginning at a young age, performing scenes from Beauty and the Beast with stuffed animals at the age of four and appearing in small theater productions soon thereafter. He was a member of the Movie Makers Club at Macfarlane Park International Baccalaureate Elementary and the thespian club and orchestra at Howard W. Blake High School School of the Arts, both in Tampa.

Career
Teague is known for his roles in Bloodline (2015) and the episode "Arkangel" of the fourth season of Black Mirror (2017).

In 2016, he was cast in a supporting role in the supernatural thriller The Empty Man, based on a graphic novel by Cullen Bunn. He played Nolan Rayburn in the second season of Bloodline, at which point Teague was still going to high school. In 2016, he also had a part in the film Cell, based on a Stephen King book.

He was cast in Mary in 2017. Teague was being represented by APA, Management 360, Brevard Talent Group, and Myman Greenspan. Teague also appeared as Patrick Hockstetter in It (2017) and It Chapter Two (2019).

In 2017, he joined the crime thriller Inherit the Viper. He also joined the romance film Every Day, based on a novel by David Levithan.

He signed with CAA in 2018. Also that year, he was in the film Heft, as 17-year-old student Kel Keller dealing with baseball aspirations and family drama. In Mrs. Fletcher, a 2019 HBO series, he played Julian, a "19-year-old enamored with a 46-year-old divorcée named Eve", and played Alec in the thriller I See You (2019).

In August 2020, it was announced he would be playing Tommy Stinson in a Replacements biopic, Trouble Boys. He was cast as the character Harold Lauder in the 2020 CBS miniseries The Stand. According to Teague, The Stand had been a favorite book of his since the age of 13. He noted he tried to draw directly from Lauder's psychology in The Stand novel. As Harold Lauder, he plays a sociopathic teenager being tempted by evil during a pandemic. Consequence of Sound wrote that Teague plays Lauder with "nuanced perfection, capturing the insecurity, pomposity, and rage of one of the most dynamic characters in King's vast tapestry".

In August 2022, Teague was cast in the lead role in the film Kingdom of the Planet of the Apes, to be directed by Wes Ball for 20th Century Studios.

Filmography

Film

Television

References

External links

1998 births
Living people
Male actors from Tampa, Florida
American male film actors
American male television actors
21st-century American male actors